The Crescent City Fall Classic is an annual 5-kilometer race held in New Orleans, Louisiana, United States. The race is held the second Saturday in November in City Park.

See also
Crescent City Classic

References

External links
Official site

5K runs
Road running competitions in the United States
Road Running